In linear algebra, geometry, and trigonometry, the Cayley–Menger determinant is a formula for the content, i.e. the higher-dimensional volume, of a -dimensional simplex in terms of the squares of all of the distances between pairs of its vertices. The determinant is named after Arthur Cayley and Karl Menger.

The  pairwise distance polynomials between n points in a real Euclidean space are Euclidean invariants that are associated via the Cayley-Menger relations. These relations served multiple purposes such as generalising Heron's Formula, computing the content of a n-dimensional simplex, and ultimately determining if any real symmetric matrix is a Euclidean distance matrix in the field of Distance geometry.

History 
Karl Menger was a young geometry professor at the University of Vienna and Arthur Cayley was a British mathematician who specialized in algebraic geometry. Menger extended Cayley's algebraic excellence to propose a new axiom of metric spaces using the concepts of distance geometry and relation of congruence, known as the Cayley-Menger determinant. This ended up generalising one of the first discoveries in distance geometry, Heron's formula, which computes the area of a triangle given its side lengths.

Definition 
These points are the vertices of an n-dimensional simplex: a triangle when ; a tetrahedron when , and so on.

 

This is the Cayley–Menger determinant. For  it is a symmetric polynomial in the 's and is thus invariant under permutation of these quantities. This fails for  but it is always invariant under permutation of the vertices.

Except for the final row and column of 1s, the matrix in the second form of this equation is a Euclidean distance matrix.

Special cases

2-Simplex 
To reiterate, a simplex is an n-dimensional polytope and the convex hull of  points which do not lie in any  dimensional plane. Therefore, a 2-simplex occurs when  and the simplex results in a triangle. Therefore, the formula for determining  of a triangle is provided below:

3-Simplex 
Similarly, a 3-simplex occurs when  and the simplex results in a tetrahedron. Therefore, the formula for determining  of a tetrahedron is provided below:

As a result, the equation above presents the content of a 3-simplex, which is the volume of a tetrahedron where the edge between vertices  and  has length .

Proof 
Let the column vectors  be  points in -dimensional Euclidean space.  Starting with the volume formula

we note that the determinant is unchanged when we add an extra row and column to make an  matrix,

where  is the square of the length of the vector .  Additionally, we note that the  matrix

Thus,

Generalization to hyperbolic and spherical geometry 
There are spherical and hyperbolic generalizations. A proof can be found here.

In a spherical space of dimension  and constant curvature , any  points satisfy

 

In a hyperbolic space of dimension  and constant curvature , any  points satisfy

 

Example 

 

The result in the third line is due to the Fibonacci identity. The final line can be rewritten to obtain Heron's formula for the area of a triangle given three sides, which was known to Archimedes prior.

Finding the circumradius of a simplex 
Given a nondegenerate n-simplex, it has a circumscribed n-sphere, with radius . Then the (n + 1)-simplex made of the vertices of the n-simplex and the center of the n-sphere is degenerate. Thus, we have 

 

In particular, when , this gives the circumradius of a triangle in terms of its edge lengths.

Set Classifications 
From these determinants, we also have the following classifications:

Straight 
A set Λ (with at least three distinct elements) is called straight if and only if, for any three elements A, B, and C of Λ,

Plane 
A set Π (with at least four distinct elements) is called plane if and only if, for any four elements A, B, C and D of Π,

 
but not all triples of elements of Π are straight to each other;

Flat 
A set Φ (with at least five distinct elements) is called flat if and only if, for any five elements A, B, C, D and E of Φ,

 

but not all quadruples of elements of Φ are plane to each other; and so on.

Menger's Theorem 
Karl Menger made a further discovery after the development of the Cayley-Menger determinant, which became known as Menger's Theorem. The theorem states: 

 A semimetric  is Euclidean of dimension n if and only if all Cayley-Menger determinants on  points is strictly positive, all determinants on  points vanish, and a Cayley-Menger determinant on at least one set of  points is nonnegative (in which case it is necessarily zero).

In simpler terms, if every subset of  points can be isometrically embedded in an  but not generally dimensional Euclidean space, then the semimetric is Euclidean of dimension  unless  consists of exactly  points and the Cayley-Menger determinant on those  points is strictly negative. This type of semimetric would be classified pseudo-Euclidean.

Realization of a Euclidean distance matrix 
Given the Cayley-Menger relations as explained above, the following section will bring forth two algorithms to decide whether a given matrix is a distance matrix corresponding to a Euclidean point set. The first algorithm will do so when given a matrix AND the dimension, via a geometric constraint solving algorithm. The second algorithm does so when the dimension, is not provided. This algorithm theoretically finds a realization of the full  Euclidean distance matrix in the smallest possible embedding dimension in quadratic time.

Theorem (d is given) 
For the sake and context of the following theorem, algorithm, and example, slightly different notation will be used than before resulting in an altered formula for the volume of the  dimensional simplex below than above.

 Theorem. For  to have a realization in dimension , if , then .

As stated before, the purpose to this theorem comes from the following algorithm for realizing a Euclidean Distance Matrix or a Gramian Matrix.

Algorithm 
 Input
 Euclidean Distance Matrix  or Gramian Matrix .

 Output
 Pointset 

 Procedure

 Otherwise, we can solve for one point at a time.
 Solve for the coordinates of  using its distances to all previously placed points .  Thus,  is represented by at most  coordinate values, ensuring minimum dimension and complexity.

Example 
Let each point  have coordinates .  To place the first three points:

 Put  at the origin, so .
 Put  on the first axis, so .
 To place :

In order to find a realization using the above algorithm, the discriminant of the distance quadratic system must be positive, which is equivalent to  having positive volume.  In general, the volume of the  dimensional simplex formed by the  vertices is given by

.

In this formula above,  is the Cayley-Menger determinant. This volume being positive is equivalent to the determinant of the volume matrix being positive.

Theorem (d not given) 
Let K be a positive integer and D be a n × n symmetric hollow matrix with nonnegative elements, with n ≥ 2. D is a Euclidean distance matrix with dim(D) = K if and only if there exist  and an index set I =  such that

 

where  realizes D, where  denotes the  component of the  vector. 
The extensive proof of this theorem can be found at the following reference.

Algorithm - K = edmsph(D, x) 

 Γ 
 if Γ  ∅; then 
 return ∞ 
 else if Γ 
 
 else if Γ
 
  ← expand()
 I ← I ∪ {i}
 K ← K + 1 
 else
 error: dim aff(span()) < K - 1 
 end if 

end for 
return K

See also 
Distance Geometry
Euclidean Space
Euclidean Distance Matrix
Simplex 
Heron's Formula

Notes

References 

Determinants